American rapper and singer Nelly has released eight studio albums, two compilation albums, one remix album, three extended plays, two mixtapes, 49 singles (including fourteen as a featured performer), three promotional singles and 48 music videos. He was also a member of the hip hop group St. Lunatics, which included fellow rappers Ali, City Spud, Murphy Lee, and Kyjuan. Nelly has sold a total of 21,815,000 albums in the US as of June 2014, making him the fourth bestselling rap artist in the country.

Nelly pursued a career as a solo performer after the St. Lunatics initially failed to achieve commercial success. He soon caught the attention of Universal Records, who signed him on a record deal. Nelly released his debut solo studio album, Country Grammar, in 2000, with most of the album's production coming from Jason Epperson. The album topped the US Billboard 200 and spawned the internationally successful singles "Country Grammar (Hot Shit)", "E.I.", "Ride wit Me" and "Batter Up", with all except the latter song also reaching the top 15 on the US Billboard Hot 100. County Grammar has since been certified ten times platinum by the Recording Industry Association of America, and as of January 2011 had sold 8,489,000 copies in the United States, making it the fourth highest-selling hip hop album of all time. The following year, Nelly collaborated with the American R&B group Jagged Edge on the single "Where the Party At" and appeared on a remix of "Girlfriend", a song by boy band 'N Sync, in 2002. Both songs reached the top five of the Hot 100.

Nelly's second studio album, Nellyville, was released in the same year. It reached number one on the Billboard 200, as well as appearing in the top five of several European album charts. Five singles were released from Nellyville, including the Hot 100-topping singles "Hot in Herre" and "Dilemma", as well as "Air Force Ones", "Work It" and "Pimp Juice". In 2004, Nelly received criticism stemming from the music video for his song "E.I. (Reinvention)", also known as "Tip Drill", for its overtly sexual content and apparent objectification of women. Despite this negative publicity, he went on to collaborate with fellow rappers P. Diddy and Murphy Lee on "Shake Ya Tailfeather", a song recorded for the soundtrack to the 2003 film Bad Boys II. It reached number one in the United States. Nelly's respective third and fourth studio albums, Sweat and Suit, were released simultaneously later in 2004: the former featuring urban and uptempo-oriented material, while the latter is more pop-themed. A total of seven singles were released from the two albums in total, with "Over and Over"– a collaboration with country singer Tim McGraw– proving the most successful, reaching number three on the Hot 100 and number one on the UK Singles Chart. A compilation album containing several songs from the two albums, titled Sweatsuit, was released in 2005. It also featured the single "Grillz", which became Nelly's fourth single to top the Hot 100.

Nelly's fifth album, Brass Knuckles, was released in 2008, featuring the singles "Wadsyaname", "Party People", "Stepped on My J'z", "Body on Me" and "One and Only". However, it failed to match the commercial success of Nelly's previous albums, only reaching number three on the Billboard 200. Nelly's sixth album, 5.0, followed in 2010. "Just a Dream", the first single from 5.0, became Nelly's most successful song in several years, reaching number three on the Hot 100. The album spawned two further singles, "Move That Body" and "Gone". His seventh album, M.O., was released in 2013, and included the UK top-ten single "Hey Porsche".

Nelly's eighth album, Heartland, was released in 2021 and included the single "Lil Bit" featuring country music duo Florida Georgia Line.

Albums

Studio albums

Compilation albums

Live albums

Remix albums

Mixtapes

Extended plays

Singles

As lead artist

As featured artist

Promotional singles

Other charted and certified songs

Guest appearances

Music videos

As lead artist

As featured performer

Notes

References

External links
 Official website
 
 

Discography
Hip hop discographies
Discographies of American artists